Gerd B. Müller (born 1953) is an Austrian biologist who is emeritus professor at the University of Vienna where he was the head of the Department of Theoretical Biology in the Center for Organismal Systems Biology. His research interests focus on vertebrate limb development, evolutionary novelties, evo-devo theory, and the Extended Evolutionary Synthesis. He is also concerned with the development of 3D based imaging tools in developmental biology.

Biography
Müller received an M.D. in 1979 and a Ph.D. in zoology in 1985, both from the University of Vienna. He has been a sabbatical fellow at the Department of Developmental Biology, Dalhousie University, Canada, (1988) and a visiting scholar at the Museum of Comparative Zoology, Harvard University, and received his Habilitation in Anatomy and Embryology in 1989. He is a founding member of the Konrad Lorenz Institute for Evolution and Cognition Research, Klosterneuburg, Austria, of which he has been President since 1997. Müller is on the editorial boards of several scientific journals, including Biological Theory where he serves as an associate editor. He is editor-in-chief of the Vienna Series in Theoretical Biology, a book series devoted to theoretical developments in the biosciences, published by MIT Press.

Scientific contribution 
Müller has published on developmental imaging, vertebrate limb development, the origins of phenotypic novelty, EvoDevo theory, and evolutionary theory.

With the cell and developmental biologist Stuart Newman, Müller co-edited the book Origination of Organismal Form (MIT Press, 2003). This book on evolutionary developmental biology is a collection of papers on generative mechanisms that were plausibly involved in the origination of disparate body forms during early periods of organismal life. Particular attention is given to epigenetic factors, such as physical determinants and environmental parameters, that may have led to the spontaneous emergence of bodyplans and organ forms during a period when multicellular organisms had relatively plastic morphologies. Natural selection acting on variant genotypes is suggested to have "locked in" these bodyplans.

Together with Eva Jablonka, Kevin Laland, Alex Mesoudi, Stuart Newman, Massimo Pigliucci, Kim Sterelny, John Odling-Smee, Tobias Uller, as well as Denis Noble and others, Gerd Müller is an advocate of an alternative evolutionary framework, one version of which has been termed the Extended Evolutionary Synthesis (EES). In contrast to the Modern Synthesis, the population dynamical model of evolution established in the early twentieth century that had concentrated on the processes of variation and adaptation, the focus of the EES is on the generative properties of evolution, integrating conceptual developments from evolutionary developmental biology, genomics, ecology, and other fields. It differs from the standard theory in its inclusion of the constructive processes in development, the consideration of reciprocal dynamics of causation, and the relinquishment of a predominantly genetic explanation. A range of novel predictions and testable empirical projects result from the EES.

Publications

Scientific papers
 ResearchGate

Edited books
Evolution – The Extended Synthesis (2010, together with Massimo Pigliucci)
Modeling Biology (2007, together with M. Laubichler)
Environment, Development, and Evolution: Towards a Synthesis (2004, together with Brian K. Hall and Roy D. Pearson)
Origination of Organismal Form (2003, together with Stuart Newman)

Selected articles
 Axel Lange and Gerd B. Müller. Polydactyly in Development, Inheritance, and Evolution. Q. Rev. Biol. Vol. 92, No. 1, Mar. 2017, pp. 1–38. doi: 10.1086/690841.
 Favé M-J, Johnson RA, Cover S, Handschuh S, Metscher BD, Müller GB, Gopalan S, Abouheif E. 2015. Past climate change on Sky Islands drives novelty in a core developmental gene network and its phenotype. BMC Evolutionary Biology:1–21.  doi: 10.1186/s12862-015-0448-4.
 Laland KN, Uller T, Feldman MW, Sterelny K, Müller GB, Moczek A, Jablonka E, Odling-Smee J. 2015. The Extended Evolutionary Synthesis: Its structure, assumptions and predictions. Proc Biol Sci 282. doi: 10.1098/rspb.2015.1019.
 Noble D, Jablonka E, Joyner MJ, Müller GB, Omholt SW. 2014. Evolution evolves: Physiology returns to centre stage. J Physiol (Lond) 592:2237–2244. doi: 10.1113/jphysiol.2014.273151.
 Mayer C, Metscher BD, Müller GB, Mitteroecker P. 2014. Studying developmental variation with geometric morphometric image analysis (GMIA). PLoS ONE 9:e115076. doi: 10.1371/journal.pone.0115076.
 Lange A, Nemeschkal HL, Müller GB. 2014. Biased polyphenism in polydactylous cats carrying a single point mutation: The Hemingway model for digit novelty. Evol Biol 41:262–275. doi:10.1007/s11692-013-9267-y.
 Čapek D, Metscher BD, Müller GB. 2013. Thumbs down: A molecular-morphogenetic approach to avian digit homology. J Exp Zool B Mol Dev Evol 322:1–12. doi: 10.1002/jez.b.22545.
 Peterson T, Müller GB. 2013. What is evolutionary novelty? Process versus character based definitions. J Exp Zool B Mol Dev Evol 320:345–350. doi: 10.1002/jez.b.22508. Epub 2013 Jun 21.
 Metscher BD, Müller GB. 2011. MicroCT for molecular imaging: Quantitative visualization of complete three-dimensional distributions of gene products in embryonic limbs. Dev Dyn 240:2301–2308. doi: 10.1002/dvdy.22733.
 Müller GB. 2008. Evo-devo as a discipline. In: Minelli A, Fusco G, editors. Evolving Pathways: Key Themes in Evolutionary Developmental Biology. Cambridge: Cambridge University Press.
 Müller GB. 2007. Evo-devo: Extending the evolutionary synthesis. Nat Rev Genet 8:943–949. doi:10.1038/nrg2219.
 Müller GB, Newman SA. 2005. The innovation triad: An EvoDevo agenda. J Exp Zool B Mol Dev Evol 304:487–503. doi: 10.1002/jez.b.21081.

External links
Personal homepage Gerd B. Müller
Department of Theoretical Biology, University of Vienna
Konrad Lorenz Institute for Evolution and Cognition Research
 Does evolutionary theory need a rethink? (2014)
 Modernizing the Evolutionary Synthesis. Science 321 (2008)
 Postmodern Evolution? Nature 455 (2008)

References

1953 births
Extended evolutionary synthesis
Theoretical biologists
University of Vienna alumni
Academic staff of the University of Vienna
Harvard University staff
Evolutionary biologists
Living people